Sidney Robert Buchman (March 27, 1902 – August 23, 1975) was an American screenwriter and film producer who worked on about 40 films from the late 1920s to the early 1970s. He received four Oscar nominations and won once for Best Screenplay for fantasy romantic comedy film Here Comes Mr. Jordan (1941) along with Seton I. Miller.

Biography 
Born to a Jewish family, in Duluth, Minnesota, and educated at Columbia University, where he was a member of the Philolexian Society, he served as President of the Screen Writers Guild of America in 1941–1942. Buchman was one of the most successful Hollywood screenwriters of the 1930s and 1940s.

His scripts from this period include The Right to Romance (1933), She Married Her Boss (1935), The King Steps Out (1936), Theodora Goes Wild (1936) and Holiday (1938). He would go on to receive Academy Award nominations for his writing on Mr. Smith Goes to Washington (1939), The Talk of the Town (1942), and Jolson Sings Again (1949), winning an Oscar for Here Comes Mr. Jordan (1941). He also did uncredited work on various films during this period, notably The Awful Truth. He was the 1965 recipient of the Laurel Award of the Writers Guild of America, West.

Buchman's refusal to provide the names of American Communist Party members to the House Un-American Activities Committee led to a charge of contempt of Congress. Buchman was fined, given a year's suspended sentence, and was then blacklisted by the Hollywood movie studio bosses.

He would return to screenwriting in the 1960s, working on Cleopatra (1963) and The Group (1966).

Personal life 
Buchman married twice and had one daughter, Susanna Silver, with his first wife. His  granddaughter and grandson are Amanda Silver and Michael B. Silver, respectively. He died in his adopted home in Cannes on August 23, 1975, at the age of 73.

Selected filmography 
 The Music Goes 'Round (1936)
 The King Steps Out (1936)
 The Howards of Virginia (1940)

Awards and nominations 

Sidney Buchman received a Laurel Award for Screenwriting Achievement at the 17th Writers Guild of America Awards on March 17, 1965.

References

External links 

1902 births
1975 deaths
Writers from Duluth, Minnesota
American male screenwriters
Hollywood blacklist
Columbia University alumni
Jewish American screenwriters
American people of Lithuanian-Jewish descent
Best Adapted Screenplay Academy Award winners
20th-century American businesspeople
Screenwriters from Minnesota
Film producers from Minnesota
20th-century American male writers
20th-century American screenwriters
20th-century American Jews